Recall elections for four Wisconsin state senators were held during the spring of 2012. Voters put four state senators up for recall, all Republicans, because of the budget repair bill proposed by Governor Scott Walker and circumstances surrounding it. Democrats targeted Republicans for voting to significantly limit public employee collective bargaining. Scholars could cite only four times in American history when more than one state legislator has been recalled at roughly the same time over the same issue. The recall elections occurred on June 5, with May 8 being the date of the primary election.

These recall elections followed the largest group of recall elections in U.S. history during the previous year, in which Republicans kept control of the Wisconsin Senate. In the June 5, 2012 recall elections, Democrats appeared to have taken over one seat from Republicans. Although the victory gave Democrats control of the Senate, the state legislature would not be in regular session again until after the November 2012 election when control of the legislature would again be contested. After the November 2012 election, Republicans regained control of the state Senate due to the resignation of one Democrat and two losses by Democrats to Republicans.

Successful petitions

Additional recall election proposals
Paperwork was filed with the state Government Accountability Board in March 2012 authorizing an effort to collect recall signatures against Senator Bob Jauch (D-Poplar) and explore recalling Senator Dale Schultz (R-Richland Center). Both efforts were launched by persons affiliated with the Citizens For Responsible Government Network, saying both Senators cost the state jobs. Both Senators opposed a bill that would have helped a Florida company open an iron mine in Wisconsin's north woods.  The mining bill would have reworked Wisconsin's permitting process to help Gogebic Taconite open an iron mine just south of Lake Superior in Jauch's district. The company had claimed the project would create hundreds of needed jobs in northwestern Wisconsin, and Republicans touted the bill as their signature job-creation legislation this past session. 15,270 signatures were required to force Jauch into a recall election. 14,545 signatures were required to force Schultz into a recall election. The group came up short in their efforts to obtain signatures and said they would try again after the Walker gubernatorial recall election on June 5, 2012.

Polling

Results

Primaries

General elections

District 21
The initial vote on June 5 showed Democrat John Lehman defeating incumbent Republican Van Wanggaard by a margin of less than 800 votes. The election canvas, a week later on June 12, confirmed Lehman won. However, on June 14, the Racine County Sheriff's Office announced it was investigating allegations of voting irregularities at the Dr. John Bryant Center in Racine, as well as reports of voter registration forms in the trash behind the Cesar Chavez Center, also in Racine. Wanggaard had until 5 p.m. on June 15 to request a recount.

On June 15, Wanggaard asked for a recount, which began on June 20, and was completed by July 2. On June 25, it was revealed that possibly thousands of voters, including 116 voters in Ward 2 of Racine, did not sign the poll book before obtaining their ballot, a violation of a new Wisconsin law passed in 2011. Despite objection by the Wanggaard campaign, the Wisconsin Government Accountability Board refused to strike the votes as invalid.  The Government Accountability Board pointed out that it would not be easy to determine which ballot was used by someone who signed the poll book and which was not.  Also the Government Accountability Board noted "Invalidating ballots based on the failure to require a signature would disenfranchise a voter due to an election official's error" as a poll worker is supposed to have voters sign the poll book before giving them a ballot rather than after. The State Senate Democratic Committee argued Republicans wanted "voter disenfranchisement" that this was "a clerical error" and "not voter fraud. Its not voter irregularities." The missing poll book signatures were largely due to newly registered voters who had already given a signature when filling out registration forms. Lehman was declared the winner by 819 votes in certified recount numbers.

See also
2011 Wisconsin protests
2011 Wisconsin Act 10
Wisconsin Supreme Court election, 2011
Wisconsin Senate recall elections, 2011
Wisconsin gubernatorial recall election, 2012

References

External links
Elections & Voting  at the Wisconsin Government Accountability Board
Database of Governor Walker and state senator recall petitions

Gubernatorial recall
Wisconsin 2012 Senate
Wisconsin State Senate elections